This is a list of Canadian organizations with designated royal status, listed by the king or queen who granted the designation.

As a matter of honour, the Canadian monarch may bestow on an organization the right to use the prefix royal before its name; this may be done for any type of constituted group, from Royal Ottawa Golf Club to the Royal Canadian Regiment. The granting of this distinction falls within the Royal Prerogative, and thus is conferred by the monarch through the office of her viceroy, with input from the Department of Canadian Heritage on whether or not the institution meets the criteria of having been in existence for at least 25 years, being financially secure, and a non-profit organization, amongst others.

Civilian

Military

Police

Events

See also
 Monarchy of Canada

References

External links
 List of civilian organizations with the prefix "Royal" prepared by the Department of Canadian Heritage

Monarchy in Canada
Royal patronage
Canadian organizations